Princess Vittoria Cristina Adelaide Chiara Maria di Savoia (born 28 December 2003) is a member of the House of Savoy. She is first-born child of Emanuele Filiberto, Prince of Venice and Piedmont and Clotilde Courau.

Early life and family
Princess Vittoria was born on 28 December 2003 in Geneva, Switzerland. She has one younger sister, Princess Luisa of Savoy. Her father Emanuele Filiberto, Prince of Venice and Piedmont is the heir apparent to the Italian throne and her mother Clotilde Courau is a French actress. Her younger sister Princess Luisa was born in 2006. She is the granddaughter of Vittorio Emanuele, Prince of Naples, the current head of the House of Savoy, and his wife Marina Doria. Her great-grandfather, King Umberto II was the last King of Italy before the monarchy was abolished in a 1946 referendum. Her great-grandmother was Marie-José of Belgium, the last Queen of Italy.

Christening
She was christened on 30 May 2004 by Monseigneur Giovanni Cheli at the Basilica of San Francesco d'Assisi in Assisi. Her godparents were Ottavio Mazzola and Roberta Fabbri. The baby wore the christening gown that had been worn by her great-great-grandfather King Vittorio Emanuele III at his christening on 31 May 1869. Among the guests were Prince Albert, Hereditary Prince of Monaco, Princess Maria Beatrice of Savoy, Prince Serge of Serbia and Princess Mafalda of Hesse, granddaughter of Princess Mafalda of Savoy. The parents selected Assisi in light of its symbolism of peace.

Succession

Princess Vittoria's grandfather, Vittorio Emanuele, Prince of Naples changed the rules of succession which previously only allowed males to be the heir to the throne. Under the rule changes, Princess Vittoria, as the first born child of her father will one day succeed him as the Head of the House of Savoy and heir to the now-defunct throne. Her parents had never produced a male heir. Despite being the heir to the Italian throne, she lives in Paris in neighboring France. The current line of succession within the House of Savoy is disputed by Prince Aimone, 6th Duke of Aosta.

Ancestry

References

External links
 Official Instagram page 

Italian princesses
People from Geneva
Italian Roman Catholics
2003 births
Living people
Princesses of Savoy
French people of Italian descent
French people of Swiss descent
Nobility from Paris
French Internet celebrities
Italian Internet celebrities
Pretenders to the Italian throne
Italian nobility
Italian exiles